Douglas GAA is a Gaelic Athletic Association club located in Douglas, County Cork, Ireland. The club participates at different levels in hurling, Gaelic football, camogie and ladies football. The club is part of the Seandún division of Cork GAA.

History
A hurling team representing Douglas participated in the first Cork Senior Hurling Championship in 1887. A number of Douglas-based clubs, including Castletreasure and St Columbas, existed through the early 20th century, before the latter was renamed 'Douglas Hurling and Football Club' in 1938. The club's first championship win was in the Cork Junior Football Championship of 1962.

Roll of honour
 Kelleher Shield (Senior Football League) (1) 2008 
 Cork Premier Intermediate Hurling Championship (1) 2009
 Cork Intermediate Hurling Championship (1) 2000
 Cork Intermediate Football Championship (1) 1997
 Cork Junior Football Championship (1) 1962
 Cork Minor Hurling Championship (2) 2015, 2022
 Cork Minor Football Championship (4) 2004, 2013, 2019, 2022
 Cork Under-21 Hurling Championship (1) 2016
 Cork Under-21 Football Championship (1) 2017
 Cork City Junior Hurling Championship (3) 1966, 1983, 1984
 Cork City Junior Football Championship (6) 1962, 1970, 1973, 2004, 2012, 2021
 Cork Senior Camogie Championship (2) 2008, 2011

Notable players
 Alan Cadogan
 Eoin Cadogan
 Eoin Cotter
 Shane Kingston
 Ronan McCarthy
 Stephen Moylan
 Seán Powter
 Brian Turnbull
 John Bennet

References

External links
Douglas GAA site

Gaelic games clubs in County Cork
Hurling clubs in County Cork
Gaelic football clubs in County Cork